Burston is a village and former civil parish, now in the parish of Burston and Shimpling, in the South Norfolk district, in the county of Norfolk, England, 3 miles (4.5 km) north of Diss. In 1931 the parish had a population of 279. In the 2011 Census, Burston and Shimpling had a population of 568 people in 234 households.

History
Burston's name is of Anglo-Saxon origin and derives from the Old English for a settlement or farmstead built around a landslip.

In the Domesday Book, Burston is listed as a settlement of 41 households belonging to King William and Robert Malet.

From 1914 to 1939, Burston was the scene of the longest strike in history when schoolteachers Tom and Annie Higdon went on strike in protest over unhygienic and inadequate schooling conditions for the local children. In 1949, the School building was registered as an educational charity and is currently operated by a board of trustees as a museum, visitor centre, village amenity and educational archive. A rally to commemorate the strike has been organised on the first Sunday of September every year since 1984 by the Transport and General Workers' Union and its successor organisation, Unite the Union.

On 1 April 1935, the parish of Shimpling was merged with Burston. On 10 July 1983, the new parish was renamed to "Burston and Shimpling". In 1931 the parish of Burston (prior to the merge) had a population of 279.

St. Mary's Church
Burston's Parish Church is of Norman origin and is dedicated to Saint Mary. In the Eighteenth Century, the tower collapsed and the parish did not have the sufficient funds to erect a replacement. The nave and chancel were significantly remodelled in the Nineteenth Century and the church has been Grade II listed since December 1959. Furthermore, the graveyard holds the graves of the Higdons who led the school strike.

Amenities
The station closed in 1966.

Notable Residents
 Annie Higdon- English schoolmistress
 Tom Higdon- English schoolmaster

War Memorial
Burston has a new War Memorial constructed out of marble and brick on Church Green, complete with a researched book containing details of the fallen and those who served during the conflicts of the Twentieth Century. It lists the following names for the First World War:
 Sergeant Frederick G. Bryant (1895-1916), 1/6th Battalion, Durham Light Infantry
 Lance-Sergeant Herbert Garnham (1890-1915), 9th Battalion, Royal Norfolk Regiment
 Corporal George W. Durbridge (1898-1918), 12th Battalion, Machine Gun Corps
 Private William E. East (1896-1916), 2nd Battalion, Essex Regiment
 Private Gurney R. Sandy (1895-1918), 8th Battalion, Lincolnshire Regiment
 Private Edward K. Potter (1888-1917), 2nd Battalion, Royal Norfolk Regiment
 Private George W. Sandy (1894-1915), 7th Battalion, Royal Norfolk Regiment
 Private George W. Johnson (1890-1917), 2nd Battalion, South Wales Borderers

Notes

External links

Villages in Norfolk
Former civil parishes in Norfolk
South Norfolk